Girah Kandi (also Romanized as Gīrah Kandī; also known as Esmāʿīl Kandī) is a village in Chaybasar-e Sharqi Rural District, in the Central District of Poldasht County, West Azerbaijan Province, Iran. At the 2006 census, its population was 352, in 71 families.

References 

Populated places in Poldasht County